The 2001 FIVB Volleyball World League was the 12th edition of the annual men's international volleyball tournament, played by 16 countries from 11 May to 30 June 2001. The Final Round was held in Katowice, Poland.

Pools composition

Intercontinental round

Pool A

|}

|}

Pool B

|}

|}

Pool C

|}

|}

Pool D

|}

|}

Final round
Venue:  Spodek, Katowice, Poland

Pool play

Pool E

|}

|}

Pool F

|}

|}

Final four

Semifinals

|}

3rd place match

|}

Final

|}

Final standing

Awards
Best Scorer
 Ivan Miljković
Best Spiker
 André Nascimento
Best Blocker
 Gustavo Endres
Best Server
 Luigi Mastrangelo

References

External links
2001 World League Results
Sports123 
Volleyball Almanac

FIVB Volleyball World League
FIVB World League
Volleyball
2001 in Polish sport